Xifu, also known as Chinese opera costume in English, are the stage clothes and attire worn in Chinese opera, such as Kunqu, Cantonese opera, Beijing opera, Huangmei opera. Some of these costumes bear some resemblance to the Hanfu system but also show some differences in terms of clothing ornaments and decorations, as well as colour system, and in design and construction. In 2006, the techniques used to produce Beijing opera costumes were included in the national intangible cultural heritage list.

Beijing opera 

Beijing opera was created in 1790 during the reign of Emperor Qianlong in the Qing dynasty; however, the origins of its costumes can be traced back to the 14th century. The costumes were set in the Qing dynasty but its style mainly followed the Ming dynasty's hanfu-style clothing. They also absorbed some characteristics of the clothing style worn in the Song, Yuan, and Qing dynasties. Based on various forms of historical clothing, modifications were made to meet the needs of the play (including the singing and dancing movements of the actors).

Beijing opera costumes tend to be decorated with embroidery and exaggerated decorative patterns; the colours also tend to be bright. These costumes are crucial for the audience to understand the play. These costumes follows a social hierarchy (which includes nobles, the humble born, civilians, military, official or private citizens); they also feature special ornamental patterns and decorations which are crucial in differentiating social class of the characters.  The costumes also allow the audience to distinguish a character's sex. They also use subtle differences to distinguish between loyal and wicked characters. Since the costumes used is the same regardless of seasons, weather is described in every scene of the play and is indicated by the actors' movements rather than on his clothing.

There are 20 major types of costumes, which include: Mang, an informal robe which is generally used for the emperor, nobles, civil and military officials, etc.; pi; kao (an armor, which is used for soldiers), xuezi. Some costumes were also designed by Mei Lanfang, which include guzhuang and the yuntai zhuang (cloud terrace costume).

Cantonese opera 

Most Cantonese opera costumes are derived from the clothing style of the Ming dynasty, with the exception of some which are based on the clothing of the Qing dynasty. When depicting plays which are set in all other dynasties except the Qing dynasty, Ming-style costumes are used. The Qing-style costumes are only used when the plays are set in the Qing dynasty. 

The standards which are used to indicate particular roles or characters through the wearing of costumes are not as strict as those in Beijing opera. The costumes are typically specific to a general role and to a character type, but they are rarely use to represent a specific character. The clothing can be divided into civil and military where the sleeves indicate if the character is civil or military. Colours are also used to indicate the role and character type.

Cantonese opera costumes include the fan gongzhuang, haiqing,. Water sleeves were rarely used prior to the World War II.

Huangmei opera 

Huangmei opera costumes typically used ancient-style garments as most plays are based on Chinese folk tales.

Kunqu 

Kunqu opera costumes are also based on the clothing style of the Ming dynasty; however, these historical clothing were modified to make turn it into a more elaborate and exaggerated version. 

The decorations used on the costumes are simple but they often give information about the character's personality; for example, peonies on the robe of a young man may indicate that he is a playboy. Water sleeves are also used in Kunqu opera to accentuate the actors' dance movements.

Types of xifu

Gallery

See also 
 Hanfu
 Guzhuang
 Qizhuang
 Chinese opera

Footnotes

References

Notes 

Chinese traditional clothing
Performing arts
Costume design